This is a list of awards and nominations received by American girl group TLC.

American Music Awards

Created by Dick Clark in 1973, the American Music Awards is an annual music awards ceremony and one of several major annual American music awards shows. TLC has won one award from seven nominations.

|-
!scope="row" rowspan= "3" | 1993
| TLC
| Favorite Pop/Rock New Artist
| 
|-
| TLC
| Favorite Rap/Hip-Hop New Artist
| 
|-
| TLC
| Favorite Rap/Hip-Hop Artist
| 
|-
!scope="row" rowspan= "3" | 1996
| CrazySexyCool
| Favorite Soul/R&B Album
| 
|-
| TLC
| Favorite Soul/R&B Band, Duo or Group
| 
|-
| TLC
| Favorite Artist of the Year
| 
|-
!scope="row" | 2000
| TLC
| Favorite Band, Duo or Group – Soul/Rhythm & Blues
| 
|-

Grammy Awards

The Grammy Awards are an annual music awards ceremony and one of several major annual American music awards shows. TLC has won four awards from twelve nominations.

|-
!scope="row" rowspan= "4" | 1996
| CrazySexyCool
| Best R&B Album
| 
|-
| "Creep"
| Best R&B Performance by a Duo or Group with Vocals
| 
|-
| rowspan= "2" |"Waterfalls"
| Record of the Year
| 
|-
| Best Pop Performance by a Duo or Group with Vocals
| 
|-
!scope="row" rowspan= "6" | 2000
| rowspan= "2" | Fanmail
| Album of the Year
| 
|-
| Best R&B Album
| 
|-
| rowspan= "2" | "No Scrubs"
| Record of the Year
| 
|-
| Best R&B Performance by a Duo or Group with Vocals
| 
|-
| rowspan= "2" | "Unpretty"
| Best Pop Performance by a Duo or Group with Vocals
| 
|-
| Best Short Form Music Video
| 
|-
!scope="row" rowspan= "1" | 2003
| "Girl Talk"
| rowspan= "2" |Best R&B Performance by a Duo or Group with Vocals
| 
|-
!scope="row" rowspan= "1" | 2004
| "Hands Up"
| 
|-

MOBO Awards

The MOBO Awards stands for "Music of Black Origin" and was established in 1996 by Kanya King and Andy Ruffell. The MOBO Award show is held annually in the United Kingdom to recognise artists of any ethnicity or nationality performing black music. In 2009, the awards ceremony was held for the first time in Glasgow. Prior to that, it had been held in London. In 2011, the ceremony returned for a second time to Scotland. The awards then moved to Leeds for 2015.

|-
!scope="row" | 1996
| "Waterfalls"
| Best R&B/Soul Album – Group, Band or Duo
| 
|-
!scope="row" | 1999
| No Scrubs
| Best Video
| 
|-
!scope="row" | 2012
| rowspan="1" | TLC 
| Contribution to Music 
| 
|-

MTV Video Music Awards

An MTV Video Music Award (commonly abbreviated as a VMA) is an award presented by the cable channel MTV to honor the best in the music video medium. TLC have won 5 awards from 8 nominations.

|-
!scope="row" rowspan= "5" | 1995

!scope="row" rowspan= "5" | "Waterfalls"
| Video of the Year
| 
|-

| Best Group Video
| 
|-

| Best R&B Video
| 
|-

| Viewer's Choice
| 
|-

| Breakthrough Video
| 
|-

!scope="row" rowspan= "3" | 1999
!scope="row" rowspan= "3" | "No Scrubs"
| Best Group Video
| 
|-
| Best Hip-Hop Video
| 
|-
| Viewer's Choice
| 
|-

Pop Awards

The Pop Awards are presented annually by Pop Magazine, honoring the best in popular music.

|-
!scope="row6" | 2018
| TLC
| Lifetime Achievement Award
| 
|-

See also
List of best-selling music artists in the United States
List of best-selling girl groups

References

External links
TLC at MTV.com
TLC discography at iMusic.am

TLC at Last.fm

Awards
TLC